Sofia Tomasoni (born 27 February 2002 in Bologna) is an Italian kitesurfer and winner of the women's Youth Olympic title in Twin Tip Racing in 2018. Sofia was the first woman to ever win an Olympic title in the history of kitesurfing. She ranked first in the world for Twin Tip Racing in the years 2017 and 2018 before switching to the Formula Kite discipline.

Achievements

See also 
 Girl medallists at the Sailing Youth Olympic Games.

References

External links 
 
 

Female kitesurfers
2002 births
Living people
People from Bologna
Italian female sailors (sport)
Youth Olympic gold medalists for Italy
21st-century Italian women